Sorkh-e Kan (also Romanized as Sorkh-e Kān; also known as Sorkhegān) is a village in Garmsar Rural District, Jebalbarez-e Jonubi District, Anbarabad County, Kerman Province, Iran. At the 2006 census, its population was 135, in 28 families.

References 

Populated places in Anbarabad County